End of the Trail is a 1932 American Pre-Code Western film directed by D. Ross Lederman.

Cast
 Tim McCoy as Captain Tim Travers
 Luana Walters as Luana (as Luanna Walters)
 Wheeler Oakman as Major Jenkins
 Wade Boteler as Sergeant O'Brien
 Lafe McKee as Colonel John Burke
 Wally Albright as Jimmy 'Sonny' Travers
 Chief White Eagle as Chief Grey Bear

References

External links
 

1932 films
1932 Western (genre) films
American Western (genre) films
American black-and-white films
1930s English-language films
Columbia Pictures films
Films directed by D. Ross Lederman
Films based on works by Zane Grey
1930s American films